Courtney Sheinmel (born 1977 in Palo Alto, California) is the author of over a dozen books for kids and teens. She lives in New York City.

Biography

Courtney has one sister, the young adult writer Alyssa Sheinmel, and three stepsiblings.

She graduated with honors from Barnard College (part of Columbia University), and Fordham School of Law. Courtney spent several years as a law firm associate, and on the weekends, she worked on what became her first middle grade novel, My So-Called Family (2008), which was praised for its heartfelt and insightful portrayal of what makes a family. Upon its publication, Courtney left the practice of law and began writing full-time.

The protagonist of her second novel, Positively (2009), was a teenager living with HIV, inspired by Courtney's own longtime involvement with the Elizabeth Glaser Pediatric AIDS Foundation.

Courtney continued to delve into unique and sometimes difficult family situations in books like All the Things You Are (2011)  and Edgewater (2015). She is also the author of the young readers series Stella Batts, the middle grade series The Kindness Club, and co-author of the emerging reader series Agnes & Clarabelle.

In addition to writing, Courtney served as a judge on the national level for the Scholastic Art and Writing Awards, and she received a National Scholastic Outstanding Educator Award for her work as a writing instructor at Writopia Lab, a non-profit organization serving kids ages 8–18.

Bibliography

My So-Called Family 2008
Positively	2009
Sincerely	2010
All the Things You Are	2011
Stella Batts Needs a New Name 2012
Stella Batts: Hair Today, Gone Tomorrow	2012
Stella Batts: Pardon Me	2012
Stella Batts: A Case of the Meanies	2012
Stella Batts: Who's in Charge?	2013
Stella Batts: Something Blue 2014
Stella Batts: None of Your Beeswax	2014
Stella Batts: Superstar	2015
Edgewater	2015
Zacktastic	2015
Stella Batts: Scaredy Cat     2016
The Kindness Club: Chloe on the Bright Side	2016
Stella Batts: Broken Birthday	2017
Agnes & Clarabelle (co-written with Adele Griffin)	2017
Agnes & Clarabelle Celebrate! (co-written with Adele Griffin)	2017

References

External links

Website: http://courtneysheinmel.com/
Stella Batts website: http://www.stellabatts.com/splash/splash.html

Barnard College alumni
Fordham University School of Law alumni
1977 births
Living people
American children's writers
Writers from Palo Alto, California
New York (state) lawyers